Soul Dancing is the third album by American singer-songwriter Taylor Dayne. It was released in 1993 on Arista Records and peaked at No. 51 on the US Billboard 200. The album includes the singles "Send Me a Lover", "I'll Wait", "Say a Prayer", and her rendition of Barry White's "Can't Get Enough of Your Love". The song "I'll Wait" was featured in the 1994 Disney comedy Blank Check.

Critical reception
Dave Obee from Calgary Herald wrote, "Taylor Dayne is full of life, and as she sings she bites the heads off nails. She growls. Close your eyes, you can see her defiant strut. She even makes a Barry White song sound masculine." Greg Sandow from Entertainment Weekly complimented it as a "killer pop album". He added, "Can’t fault her choice of material; these are crisp, focused, hook-filled pop songs, every one of them a likely radio hit."

Track listing

Personnel 
 Taylor Dayne – lead vocals, backing vocals (5, 10)
 Shep Pettibone – keyboards (1, 4, 7), programming (1, 4, 7), sequencing (1, 4, 7)
 Tony Shimkin – keyboards (1, 4, 7, programming (1, 4, 7), sequencing (1, 4, 7)
 David Foster – acoustic piano (2)
 David Cole – keyboards (3), arrangements (3)
 James Alfano – programming (3)
 Ricky Crespo – programming (3)
 Rich Tancredi – keyboards (5, 6, 8, 9), arrangements (5, 6, 8)
 Peter Schwartz – additional keyboards (7), additional programming (7)
 Tommy Faragher – keyboards (9, 10), arrangements (9, 10)
 Louis Biancaniello – keyboards (11, 12), programming (11, 12)
 Narada Michael Walden – programming (11, 12), drums (11, 12)
 Booker T. Jones – Hammond B3 organ (12)
 Michael Landau – guitars (2)
 Chuck Loeb – guitars (3)
 Al Pitrelli – guitars (5, 6)
 Bob Cadway – guitars (8, 10)
 Vernon "Ice" Black – guitars (12)
 Neil Stubenhaus – bass (2)
 T.M. Stevens – bass (5, 6)
 Robert Clivillés – drums (3), percussion (3), arrangements (3)
 Joe Franco – drums (5, 6, 8, 10)
 Richie Jones – drum programming (9)
 Bashiri Johnson – percussion (3)
 Andrew Jerome "Babe" Pace – hi-hat (3)
 Richie Cannata – saxophone (5)
 Charlie DeChant – saxophone (6)
 Mark Russo – sax solo (11)
 Claude Gaudette – arrangements (2)
 Ric Wake – arrangements (5, 6, 8, 9, 10)
 Warren Wiebe – backing vocals (2)
 Paulette McWilliams – backing vocals (3)
 Cindy Mizelle – backing vocals (3)
 Audrey Wheeler – backing vocals (3)
 Tony Harnell – backing vocals (5, 6)
 Joe Lynn Turner – backing vocals (5, 6)
 Joe Turano – backing vocals (6)
 Karen Anderson – backing vocals (7)
 Monique Sorel – backing vocals (7)
 Kenny Bobien – backing vocals (9)
 Eddie Stockley – backing vocals (9)
 Lotti Golden – backing vocals (10)
 Kitty Beethoven – backing vocals (11)
 Nikita Germaine – backing vocals (11, 12)
 Skyler Jett – backing vocals (11)
 Tony Lindsay – backing vocals (11, 12)
 Jeanie Tracy – backing vocals (11)
 Sandy Griffith – backing vocals (12)
 Claytoven Richardson – backing vocals (12)
 Kimaya Seward – backing vocals (12)
 Monty Seward – backing vocals (12)

Production 
 Clive Davis – executive producer
 Shep Pettibone – producer (1, 4, 7), recording (1), mixing (1)
 Taylor Dayne – co-producer (1)
 Humberto Gatica – producer (2), engineer (2), mixing (2)
 David Cole – producer (3)
 Robert Clivillés – producer (3)
 Ric Wake – producer (5, 6, 8, 9, 10)
 Narada Michael Walden – producer (11, 12)
 Louis Biancaniello – associate producer (11)
 Tony Shimkin – engineer (1), mixing (1)
 Alex Rodriguez – engineer (2)
 Acar S. Key – engineer (3)
 P. Dennis Mitchell – recording (4, 7)
 Bob Cadway – track engineer (5, 6, 8, 9, 10), mixing (5, 6, 8, 9, 10)
 Guy Roche – BGV recording (6)
 Goh Hotoda – engineer (7), mixing (7)
 Marc "Elvis" Reyburn – engineer (11, 12)
 David Frazer – vocal recording and mixing (11, 12)
 Claude Gaudette – mixing (2)
 Bob Rosa – mixing (3)
 Jim "Bonzai" Caruso – mixing (4)
 Rick Bieder – additional engineer (5, 6, 8, 9, 10)
 Dan Hetzel – additional engineer (5, 6, 8, 9, 10)
 Thomas R. Yezzi – additional engineer (6, 8)
 Matt Rohr – additional engineer (12)
 Felipe Elgueta – assistant engineer (2)
 Mario Luccy – BGV recording assistant (6)
 Jeff Gray – assistant engineer (11, 12)
 Tony DeFranco – coordinator (2)
 David Barratt – production coordinator (5, 6, 8, 9, 10)
 Greg Bannan – production coordinator (track 5, 6, 8, 9, 10)
 Janice Lee – production coordinator (11, 12)
 Cynthia Shiloh – production coordinator (11, 12)
 Kevin Walden – production coordinator (11, 12)
 Susan Mendola – art direction, design
 Randee St. Nicholas – photography (Visages Style, L.A.
 Stephen Earabino – styling (Visages Style, L.A.)
 Billy B. – make-up (Stephen Knoll Salon)
 Tony Lucha – hair (Vartoli Salon, N.Y.)
 Frank Dileo at DiLeo Entertainment – management

Weekly charts

Certifications

References

1993 albums
Taylor Dayne albums
Albums produced by Humberto Gatica
Albums produced by Ric Wake
Arista Records albums